The Gentleman's Dream, The Knight's Dream or Dillusion with the World is a 1650s vanitas painting by the Spanish artist Antonio de Pereda. It is now in the Real Academia de Bellas Artes de San Fernando, whose collections it entered in 1816.

References

1650s paintings
Spanish paintings
Paintings in the collection of the Real Academia de Bellas Artes de San Fernando
Angels in art